The 2007 Winchester Council election took place on 3 May 2007 to elect members of Winchester District Council in Hampshire, England. One third of the council was up for election and the Conservative Party stayed in overall control of the council.

After the election, the composition of the council was:
Conservative 29
Liberal Democrat 23
Independent 4
Labour 1

Campaign
19 seats were contested in the election with both the Conservatives and Liberal Democrats putting up candidates in all of the contested wards. Labour had 15 candidates, the United Kingdom Independence Party 6, Green Party 2 and there were 2 independents. The Labour leader on the council, Peter Rees, stood down at the election, while St Bartholomew ward had the first Muslim candidate for the council in the Conservative Abdul Kayum. Since the 2006 council election the Conservatives had controlled the council with a narrow majority.

Refuse collection was an important issue in the election, after the Conservative council planned to move from weekly to fortnightly collections in June for more of the council area including Swanmore, Whiteley and Wickham. They said this would boost recycling, but the Liberal Democrats said residents were against the move and that they would collect kitchen waste every week if they controlled the council.

Election result
The results saw the Conservatives keep a majority on the council, with the party still having 29 seats. They gained one seat from the Liberal Democrats in Owslebury and Curdridge but lost one back in Compton and Otterbourne ward. Labour lost both of the seats they were defending on the council to leave the party with only 1 councillor. The beneficiaries were the Liberal Democrats who gained the seats in St Luke and St John and All Saints wards. The Liberal Democrats thus had 23 seats after the election, but had come within 19 votes of gaining a seat from the Conservatives in Whiteley ward, which would have deprived the Conservatives of a majority.

Ward results

Bishop's Waltham

Colden Common and Twyford

Compton and Otterbourne

Denmead

Itchen Valley

Littleton and Harestock

Owslebury and Curdridge

St. Barnabas

St. Bartholomew

St. John and All Saints

St. Luke

St. Michael

St. Paul

Swanmore and Newton

The Alresfords

Upper Meon Valley

Whiteley

Wickham

Wonston and Micheldever

References

2007
2007 English local elections
2000s in Hampshire